Santa Rita is a ghost town in Grant County in the U.S. state of New Mexico. The site of Chino copper mine, Santa Rita was located fifteen miles east of Silver City.

History
Copper mining in the area began late in the Spanish colonial period, but it was not until 1803 that Franscisco Manuel Elguea, a Chihuahua banker and businessman, founded the town of Santa Rita.  He named it Santa Rita del Cobre (Saint Rita of the Copper), after Saint Rita of Cascia and the existing mine. During the early 19th century the mine produced over 6 million pounds of copper annually. The crudely smeltered ore was shipped to Chihuahua for further smelting and then sent to Mexico City on mule back. The area was relatively peaceful, despite an occasional attack from the Warm Springs (Mimbres) band of the Chiricahua Apache, who lived nearby at the headwaters of the Gila and Mimbres rivers.

In 1837, however, an American trader named John Johnson lured the Apaches to a gathering and then massacred them to sell their scalps for the bounty offered by the Mexican government. Johnson's massacre inflamed the Apache rather than intimidated them. The rich Santa Rita copper mine in New Mexico was a principal target of Mangas Coloradas and his followers.  In 1838, 22 fur trappers were killed nearby and the Apache severed the mine's supply line. The 300 to 400 inhabitants of Santa Rita fled south toward the Janos presidio, 150 miles away, but the Apache killed nearly all of them en route. Afterwards, the Santa Rita mine was only occasionally in operation until 1873 when Apache chief Cochise signed a peace agreement with the U.S. and the mine was reopened.

Martin B. Hayes reopened the mine. However, the town continued to be subject to Apache attacks from Geronimo, Victorio and other Apache warleaders until 1886, when Geronimo surrendered for the last time. A post office opened in 1881 and the coming of the railroad five years later spurred further development of the mine.

After the Santa Rita mine was converted to an open pit in 1901, the town was forced to move several times as the pit grew. Shortly after the town relocated in 1957, heavy rains washed boulders and mud into the new townsite. The town was abandoned once and for all in 1967, and the school system for the area was discontinued in 1972.

The population of Santa Rita was about 500 in 1884. By 1915 it was 2,500, and by 1920 had reached 6,000. It remained at 6,000 until significant layoffs at the mine started in the 1950s.

Notable people
 Ralph Kiner (1922–2014), National Baseball Hall of Fame Major League Baseball player and broadcaster. Kiner number 4 is retired by the Pittsburgh Pirates, and the New York Mets honored Ralph Kiner broadcaster career by depicting a microphone along with his name and displayed on the left-field wall.
 William Harrell Nellis (1916–1944), was a United States fighter pilot who flew 70 World War II combat missions. The Nellis Air Force Base was named after him
 Harrison Schmitt (b 1935), geologist, Apollo 17 astronaut and moonwalker, U.S. Senator 1977-1983

See also

 List of ghost towns in New Mexico

References

Further reading
 Julyan, Robert Hixson (1998) "Santa Rita" The place names of New Mexico (2nd ed.) University of New Mexico Press, Albuquerque, NM, p. 326, 
 Pearce, T. M. (1965) "Santa Rita" New Mexico place names; a geographical dictionary University of New Mexico Press, Albuquerque, NM, p. 149, OCLC 420847

External links

 Sinclair, John L. (2003) "Santa Rita — the town that vanished into thin air"  SouthernNewMexico.com
 "Santarita" Ghost Towns and History of the American West

Ghost towns in New Mexico
History of Grant County, New Mexico
Geography of Grant County, New Mexico